

G

H 

 

G